A leadership election was held by the United Malays National Organisation (UMNO) party on 30 November 1990. It was won by incumbent Prime Minister and President of UMNO, Mahathir Mohamad.

Supreme Council election results
Source

Permanent Chairman

Deputy Permanent Chairman

President

Deputy President

Vice Presidents

6 other candidates withdrawn, including Najib Razak and Abu Hassan Omar.

Supreme Council Members

See also
1995 Malaysian general election
Fourth Mahathir cabinet

References

1990 elections in Malaysia
United Malays National Organisation leadership election
United Malays National Organisation leadership elections